Navy Captain Omoniyi Caleb Olubolade (born 30 November 1954) is a former Military Administrator of Bayelsa State, Nigeria who was appointed Minister of Special Duties on 6 April 2010, when Acting President Goodluck Jonathan announced his new cabinet.

Olubolade was born on 30 November 1954 at Ipoti-Ekiti in Ijero LGA of Ekiti State. 
He was commissioned into the Nigerian Navy in 1974, and attended courses including the Britannia Royal Naval College, UK in 1975 and the Naval College of Engineering, India in 1979.
On 9 June 1997, he was appointed Military Administrator of the newly created Bayelsa State by the military government of General Sani Abacha.
As governor, on 4 May 1998, he established the Bayelsa State Council for Arts & Culture.
Olubolade retired from the Nigerian Navy in 1999 at the start of the new democratic regime (Fourth Republic).

In April 2006, Olubolade was briefly arrested during a House of Representatives by-election in the Ekiti South II Federal Constituency.
He was an aspirant to become Action Congress (AC) candidate for governor of Ekiti State in the April 2007 elections.  
Later in 2006, he defected to the People's Democratic Party (PDP). He was appointed Chairman of the Ekiti State Project Monitoring Committee by Governor Segun Oni. Olubolade was a front runner in the  Ekiti state governorship race 2014 election, under the Peoples Democratic Party. Olubolade formerly declared his governorship ambition on Saturday, 22 February 2014, at the PDP state secretariat Ado Ekiti

References

1954 births
Living people
Nigerian Navy officers
Federal ministers of Nigeria
Action Congress of Nigeria politicians
Peoples Democratic Party (Nigeria) politicians
Governors of Bayelsa State
Yoruba politicians
Yoruba military personnel